Madame Tussauds Blackpool is a wax museum located in Blackpool, United Kingdom. The attraction opened in 2011, replacing the previous Louis Tussauds waxworks. It features over 80 wax figures of celebrities, film and television characters, athletes and musicians. As of March 2023, Lewis Capaldi is the latest waxwork figure to be added to the museum's collection.

History 
In March 2010, it was confirmed that a deal had been made between Blackpool Council and Leisure Parcs to purchase some of Blackpool's highest profile landmarks. The deal, totalling £38.9m, had national and local government backing and included the purchase of Blackpool Tower, Winter Gardens, Louis Tussauds Waxworks, and the Sea Life Centre. Merlin Entertainments were announced as the new operators of Blackpool Tower and Louis Tussauds, which was refurbished and rebranded as Madame Tussauds Blackpool.

Wax making process 
The process of making a wax figure can take anywhere from four to six months. After a survey has been conducted on who the attraction should include, researchers find out as much information as possible about the chosen celebrities including their hairstyle, common facial expressions, and clothing preferences. If they are able, celebrities visit the Madame Tussauds stylists who take more than 150 measurements and 200 photos, and use an oil-based paint to create a realistic skin complexion. The figure is not made entirely of wax, but also uses clay and steel.

Notable figures

References

Madame Tussauds